Pira is a locality in Victoria, Australia, located approximately 23 km from Swan Hill. It was a stop on the Piangil railway line but the station is now closed.

Pira Post Office opened on 14 July 1924 and closed in 1975.

In December 2017 Amanda Maher, a farmer from Pira, was awarded a Victorian Young Farmer's Scholarship.

References

Towns in Victoria (Australia)
Rural City of Swan Hill